Skorokhodove is an urban-type settlement in Poltava Raion (district) of Poltava Oblast in central Ukraine. Population: 

It is located 10 km away from the Kyiv-Kharkiv interstate.  
Also in the settlement there is Skorokhodove railway station.

History 
It was founded in 1938, around Artem sugar factory.
Another source has the establishment date around 1903-1905. Until 2016 the settlement was known as Artemivka. On 17 May 2016, Verkhovna Rada adopted decision to rename Artemivka to Skorokhodove according to the law prohibiting names of Communist origin.

Town was occupied on October 4, 1941, by the German army.  It was liberated on September 3, 1943.

Old Postal code used to be 315061, now it is 38831.

Demographics 

Annual growth is -1.51%.
2007 Population is estimated.

Government 
City council building is located at Artema 15, Skorohodove, Chutovo distr., Poltava reg., 38813, Ukraine.
City council consists of 25 members.

Head of city council since March 26, 2006 - Drozd Vasil Michailovich (ДРОЗД Василь Михайлович).  Born in 1950.

Elections 
2004 Presidential Elections October 31, 2004

2nd 2004 Presidential Elections November 21, 2004

2004 Presidential Elections December 26, 2004

Economy

Agriculture and Food Processing 

Sugar factory "Artem".

Skorohodovskiy Dairy Factory, Open Joint-Stock Company

Director - M. Petrinenko
Pervomaiska St.1, vil. Skorohodove, Chutivskyi distr., Poltava reg., 38813, Ukraine
 dairy products
 casein
 butter

Bread Warehouse N88, State Enterprise
Skorohodove, Chutovo distr., Poltava reg., 38813, Ukraine
Opened in 1954.
Number of employees (total in the company) 101 - 250

ZORIA Agri-Enterprise
Skorohodove, Chutovo distr., Poltava reg., 38813, Ukraine
Opened in 1992.
Number of employees (total in the company) 1 - 10

Industrial organizations 
Artemivka Motor Transport Repair Plant, PubJSC
Director - M. Petrinenko
Myru St.2, vil. Skorohodove, Chutovo distr., Poltava reg., 38813, Ukraine
Opened in 1994.
Number of employees (total in the company) 51 - 100

Education 
School
On June 2, 2004, teachers underwent short training on how to use a computer.

School of Working Youth
Theatre

References

External links

 Map

Urban-type settlements in Poltava Raion
Populated places established in 1938